A pentagonal number is a figurate number that extends the concept of triangular and square numbers to the pentagon, but, unlike the first two, the patterns involved in the construction of pentagonal numbers are not rotationally symmetrical. The nth pentagonal number pn is the number of distinct dots in a pattern of dots consisting of the outlines of regular pentagons with sides up to n dots, when the pentagons are overlaid so that they share one vertex. For instance, the third one is formed from outlines comprising 1, 5 and 10 dots, but the 1, and 3 of the 5, coincide with 3 of the 10 – leaving 12 distinct dots, 10 in the form of a pentagon, and 2 inside.

pn is given by the formula:

for n ≥ 1. The first few pentagonal numbers are:

1, 5, 12, 22, 35, 51, 70, 92, 117, 145, 176, 210, 247, 287, 330, 376, 425, 477, 532, 590, 651, 715, 782, 852, 925, 1001, 1080, 1162, 1247, 1335, 1426, 1520, 1617, 1717, 1820, 1926, 2035, 2147, 2262, 2380, 2501, 2625, 2752, 2882, 3015, 3151, 3290, 3432, 3577, 3725, 3876, 4030, 4187... .

The nth pentagonal number is the sum of n integers starting from n (i.e. from n to 2n-1). The following relationships also hold:

Pentagonal numbers are closely related to triangular numbers. The nth pentagonal number is one third of the th triangular number. In addition, where Tn is the nth triangular number.

Generalized pentagonal numbers are obtained from the formula given above, but with n taking values in the sequence 0, 1, −1, 2, −2, 3, −3, 4..., producing the sequence:

0, 1, 2, 5, 7, 12, 15, 22, 26, 35, 40, 51, 57, 70, 77, 92, 100, 117, 126, 145, 155, 176, 187, 210, 222, 247, 260, 287, 301, 330, 345, 376, 392, 425, 442, 477, 495, 532, 551, 590, 610, 651, 672, 715, 737, 782, 805, 852, 876, 925, 950, 1001, 1027, 1080, 1107, 1162, 1190, 1247, 1276, 1335... .

Generalized pentagonal numbers are important to Euler's theory of partitions, as expressed in his pentagonal number theorem.

The number of dots inside the outermost pentagon of a pattern forming a pentagonal number is itself a generalized pentagonal number.

Other properties
 for n>0 is the number of different compositions of  into n parts that don't include 2 or 3.
 is the sum of the first n natural numbers congruent to 1 mod 3.

Generalized pentagonal numbers and centered hexagonal numbers

Generalized pentagonal numbers are closely related to centered hexagonal numbers.  When the array corresponding to a centered hexagonal number is divided between its middle row and an adjacent row, it appears as the sum of two generalized pentagonal numbers, with the larger piece being a pentagonal number proper:

{| 
! 1=1+0 !! !! 7=5+2 !! !! 19=12+7 !! !! 37=22+15
|- align="center" valign="middle" style="line-height:0;"
|
|
|
|
|
|
|
|}

In general:

where both terms on the right are generalized pentagonal numbers and the first term is a pentagonal number proper (n ≥ 1).  This division of centered hexagonal arrays gives generalized pentagonal numbers as trapezoidal arrays, which may be interpreted as Ferrers diagrams for their partition.  In this way they can be used to prove the pentagonal number theorem referenced above.

Tests for pentagonal numbers
Given a positive integer x, to test whether it is a (non-generalized) pentagonal number we can compute

The number x is pentagonal if and only if n is a natural number. In that case x is the nth pentagonal number.

For generalized pentagonal numbers, it is sufficient to just check if  is a perfect square.

For non-generalized pentagonal numbers, in addition to the perfect square test, it is also required to check if

The mathematical properties of pentagonal numbers ensure that these tests are sufficient for proving or disproving the pentagonality of a number.

Gnomon
The Gnomon of the nth pentagonal number is:

Square pentagonal numbers 
A square pentagonal number is a pentagonal number that is also a perfect square.

The first few are:

0, 1, 9801, 94109401, 903638458801, 8676736387298001, 83314021887196947001, 799981229484128697805801, 7681419682192581869134354401, 73756990988431941623299373152801... (OEIS entry A036353)

See also
Hexagonal number
Triangular number

References

Further reading
Leonhard Euler: On the remarkable properties of the pentagonal numbers

Figurate numbers